William Henry Sewell (23 January 180414 November 1874), English divine and author, helped to found two public schools along high church Anglican lines. A devout churchman, learned scholar and reforming schoolmaster, he was strongly influenced by the Tractarians.

Early life
Born at Newport, Isle of Wight, the second son of a solicitor and Fellow of The Queen's College, Oxford, he had six brothers, four of whom became national figures. Richard Clarke Sewell was a recognised poet, legal writer and Fellow of Magdalen College, Oxford. Henry Sewell worked in the family firm before emigrating to become Premier of New Zealand. James Edwards Sewell was Warden of New College, Oxford (1860–1903). Elizabeth Missing Sewell wrote devotional religious books and children's stories. She founded Ventnor St Boniface School for girls.

Sewell was educated at Winchester, which he disliked as he was bullied. He went up to Merton College, Oxford, where he gained a postmastership and a first in Literae Humaniores. He was elected a Petreian Fellow of Exeter College in 1827, and then won both the Chancellor's English Essay Prize and the Chancellor's Latin Essay Prize. He was only 26 when he was ordained. From 1831 to 1853 he was a tutor at Exeter College, an Examiner in Greats, Librarian to the college, Sub-Rector, and by 1839 also Dean.

Tractarians
In 1835 Sewell applied for the Headmastership of Winchester, but was defeated by Dr Moberley by one vote. From 1836 to 1841 he was White's Professor of Moral Philosophy. Sewell, having taken holy orders in 1830, became a friend of Pusey, Newman, Keble and R. H. Froude in the earlier days of the Tractarian movement, but subsequently found that the Tractarians leant too much towards Rome and dissociated himself from them. The plot of his novel Hawkstone opposed to Newman's position at the time. When, however, in 1849, JA Froude published his Nemesis of Faith, Sewell denounced the wickedness of the book to his class, and when a pupil of his confessed to possessing a copy, he seized it, tore it to pieces and threw it in the fire.

Sewell was a prolific writer of sermons, commentaries, poetry and translations. His many correspondents included William Gladstone. He contributed to the political Quarterly Review on various subjects. Sewell was supremely confident, had a winning manner, but lacked the droll humour of the cloistered academics.

St Columba's
In April 1843, Sewell and his friends Monsell and Todd founded at Stackallan House, County Meath, St Columba's College, designed to be a sort of Irish Winchester and Eton "and something more than Winchester or Eton." It was set in beautiful countryside. In 1861 the Clarendon Commission defined it as a public school, but Sewell's aim was to provide an Anglican education for the ailing Church in Ireland, with emphasis on pastoral care and rigorous classical disciplines. The school was supported by the nobility and church. From Lord Boyne Singleton and Sewell rented the land with conspicuous approval from the Archbishop of Armagh, Lord George de la Poer Beresford, the college's Governor. Sewell hoped to inspire boys in locis parentis, giving them cubicles to live in and "strengthen, enlarge and purify their minds." With the classics they were to teach modern languages, modern history and mathematics, drawing, architecture and the Irish language.

Sewell was disliked at St Columba's. Despite his trips to raise much-needed funds, his college showed bad faith towards a financial supporter who brought it much furniture and silver. His connections at Oxford, particularly Magdalen College, were useful. Another substantial Sewell contribution was a large library collection. His colleagues wanted a more relaxed Irish Gaelic school, whereas he was known to have punished boys for failing to show table manners befitting young gentlemen. Cold showers and hard beatings were necessary, but Sewell believed the most dreaded exclusion to be from chapel. Emphasis on regular attendance at Evensong and Matins was central to his scholastic vision of a High Church interpretation of the Book of Common Prayer. While he also gained a reputation for high standards of cleanliness and medical health. Singleton agreed with Sewell that there must be fasting and feast days, but this offended Irish Protestant sensibilities. The Fellows Lord Adare and William Monsell converted to Roman Catholicism. In May 1846 he resigned with Warden Singleton to return to Oxford and Exeter College, having been outvoted by the Fellows of St Columba's. 
 
Singleton met in Turl Street to discuss the opening of another college. On 9 June 1847, he helped to found Radley College, installing Singleton as Warden. Sewell's intention was that this school too should be conducted on strict High Church principles.

Sewell was originally himself one of the managers of St Columba's, and later the third Warden of Radley, but his business management was unsuccessful in both cases, and his personal responsibility for the debts contracted by Radley caused the sequestration of his Oxford fellowship.
In 1862 his financial difficulties compelled him to leave England for Germany, where he remained until 1870.

Publications
Translations of the Agamemnon (1846), Georgics (1846 and 1854) and Odes and Epodes of Horace (1850)
Christian Morals (1840) 
Reviews of Thomas Carlyle's works, Quarterly Review, 66 (September 1840)
An Introduction to the Dialogues of Plato (1841)
A letter to the Rev. E. B.Pusey, D.D., on the publication of No.90 of the Tracts for the Times (Oxford, 1841) 
Christian Politics (1844)
Hawkstone: a tale of and for England (fiction) (1845)
Journal of a Residence at the College of St Columba (April 1847) (2nd ed. 1848)
The Nation, the Church and the University of Oxford (1849)
Suggestions for the Extension of the University, Submitted to the Rev. the Vice-Chancellor (Oxford, 1850)
Collegiate Reform: a Sermon Preached before the University of Oxford, on the first Sunday in Advent, 1853 (Oxford, 1853)
[William Sewell], A Speech at the Annual Dinner of the Old Radleians, Held at Willis Rooms, 22 June 1872, by the Founders, W.S. (Oxford, 1873) 
Reminiscences in two volumes (1873)
A Year's Sermons to Boys preached in the Chapel of St Peter's College, Radley (1854)
Sermons for Boys preached in the Chapel of St Peter's College, Radley (1859) 
Christian Vestiges of Creation (1861)

References

Christopher Dilke, Dr Moberley's Mint-Mark: A Study of Winchester College (1965)
Lionel James, A Forgotten Genius: Sewell of St Columba's and Radley (1945) 
G. K. White, A History of St Columba's College 1843–1974 (Dublin, 1980)
Christopher Hibbert, No Ordinary Place: Radley College and the Public School System 1847–1997 (London, 1997)

1804 births
1874 deaths
English religious writers
English translators
Greek–English translators
Latin–English translators
19th-century English educators
Alumni of Merton College, Oxford
Fellows of Exeter College, Oxford
Founders of English schools and colleges
White's Professors of Moral Philosophy
19th-century philanthropists
Wardens of Radley College
19th-century British translators
People educated at Winchester College